Neil Dickson (born November 26, 1950) is an English actor, who has worked extensively in both American and British film and television.

Biography
At the age of five, Dickson contracted poliomyelitis, but he was fortunate enough to make a complete recovery a year later. He attended Worksop College in Nottinghamshire playing Coriolanus in the Junior Play 1966. He graduated from the Guildhall School of Music and Drama and spent several seasons working in repertory theatres in Sheffield, Manchester, Leicester and Oxford among others.

Career
In 1975, he made his West End debut in Pinero's The Gay Lord Quex, opposite Dame Judi Dench, which was directed by Sir John Gielgud at the Albery Theatre.

While playing Dean Rebel in Trafford Tanzi at London's Mermaid Theatre, he was spotted by the producers of the NBC mini-series AD, who cast him in the lead role of Valerius. He spent the following nine months on location in Tunisia working opposite James Mason, Susan Sarandon, Ava Gardner and Ian McShane. Upon his return, he was cast in the eponymous role of James Bigglesworth in the British feature film, Biggles (American title: Biggles: Adventures in Time), which was selected as the Royal Premiere Film in 1986. He went on to star in several mini-series and the cult sci-fi series She-Wolf of London, which was given the alternative title Love & Curses when syndicated in the United States. In 2008, he starred in the film Chasing Chekhov, which won the first BAFTA LA Film Festival Award. 
 
TV credits include: I, Claudius, Secret Army, Blake's 7, Airline, Boon, Rockliffe's Babies, She-Wolf of London, Dynasty, Matlock, Baywatch, Sliders, Iron Man, Diagnosis: Murder, Alias, Mad Men and 1987 TV movie "The Murders in the Rue Morgue".

Film credits include Biggles: Adventures in Time and Romy and Michele's High School Reunion. He also appeared alongside Barbara Windsor, Joss Ackland and Gareth Hunt in the Pet Shop Boys film, It Couldn't Happen Here, Lionheart, David Lynch's Inland Empire, King of the Wind, Ridley Scott's Body of Lies and Charles Dennis's The Favour of Your Company and Chicanery. He played Nick in Barbara Taylor Bradford's "Voice of the heart" alongside Lindsay Wagner and Victoria Tennant.

In 2011 Dickson played the eponymous role in Charles Dennis's award-winning film Atwill. He reprised the role of fugitive British assassin Clive Atwill in the web series Atwill at Large and in the 2018 feature film Barking Mad. Dickson and the other actors won the Best Ensemble Cast award at the 2021 Studio City Film Festival.

Dickson's game credits include Eternal Darkness, Age of Empires III, Heroes of Might and Magic V: Hammers of Fate and The Elder Scrolls V: Skyrim.

Personal life
He currently resides with his wife Lynda and their two daughters, Lucy and Chloë, in Los Angeles.

Filmography

 La griffe du destin
 AD (1985, TV Mini-Series) – Valerius
 Biggles (1986) – James 'Biggles' Bigglesworth
 Lionheart (1987) – King Richard
 Eat the Rich (1987) – Gerry
 It Couldn't Happen Here (1987) – Pilot / car salesman
 King of the Wind (1989) – Earl of Godolphin
 A Ghost in Monte Carlo (1990, TV Movie) – Dupuis
 She-Wolf of London (1990) - Professor Ian Matheson
 Iron Man (1994 TV series) - Dreadknight (voice; recurring role)
 Police Story 4: First Strike (1996) – Australian Group No. 2
 Romy and Michele's High School Reunion (1997) – Boutique Manager
 Something to Believe In (1998) – John
 The Story of O: Untold Pleasures (2002) – Sir Stephen / benefactor
 Peak Experience (2003) – Dr. Cameron Beale
 Timecop 2: The Berlin Decision (2003) – Neil Johnson
 Spectres (2004) – Walter
 Garfield 2 (2006) – (voice)
 Caffeine (2006) – Mr. Davies
 Inland Empire (2006) – Producer
 A Good Year (2006) – (voice)
 Eragon (2006) – (voice)
 Beowulf (2007) – (voice)
 Body of Lies (2008) – BBC Newsreader (voice, uncredited)
 Immigrants (2008) – (English version, voice)
 Donna on Demand (2009) – Tony
 Jewtopia (2012) – Claude
 Sons of Liberty (2013) – Allister Salinger
 Complicit (2013) – Mr. Allusen
 Haunting of the Innocent (2014) – Erik
 Atlas Shrugged Part III: Who Is John Galt? (2014) – Dr. Robert Stadler
 Chicanery (2017) – Gareth Foyle
 Scrambled (2017) – Roman
 Black Flowers (2018) – The Ranger
 Barking Mad (2018) – Clive Atwill
 Missing Link (2019) – Doctor Roylott (voice)
 Ms. Marvel (2022) - Radio Announcer (voice; in "Time and Again")

References

External links
 
 Neil Dickson website

Living people
English male stage actors
English male film actors
English male television actors
English male voice actors
People educated at Worksop College
1951 births